is a Japanese actor and tarento represented by K Factory.

Sato graduated from Nihon University Sakuragaoka High School and Nihon University College of Art, where he was classmates with Kunihiro Suda. Sato is married and has three children.

Filmography

TV series

Films

Radio

Dubbing

References

External links
 

Japanese male film actors
Japanese male television actors
1980 births
Living people
People from Meguro
20th-century Japanese male actors
21st-century Japanese male actors